Bojan Kurajica (born 15 November 1947) is a Croatian-Bosnian chess grandmaster (GM).

Kurajica grew up in Split. He earned the International Master (IM) title in 1965 by winning the World Junior Championship. He moved to Zagreb in 1966 to study Italian and English at the Faculty of Philosophy, graduating in 1972.

Kurajica was awarded the GM title in 1974. He played chess in Zagreb until 1979, when he relocated to Sarajevo in order to play for ŠK Bosna. He played for Yugoslavia in Chess Olympiads at Valletta 1980 (won team bronze medal) and Thessaloniki 1984.

One of his notable tournament successes was joint 3rd/4th place (together with Mikhail Tal whom he beat in their individual game) at the 1976 Wijk aan Zee (Fridrik Olafsson and Ljubomir Ljubojević won). In 1979, Kurajica shared the win at the traditional Bosna tournament in Sarajevo. In 1981, he won the strong Lugano Open (first with best tie-break score).

In 1991, Kurajica broke the Guinness World record for playing a simultaneous game on the largest numbers of boards up until that moment. 

After the collapse of Yugoslavia, he represented Bosnia and Herzegovina ten times between 1992 and 2012 (won team silver medal at Moscow 1994), in total 12 Olympiad appearances. Since 2019. he represents Croatia, as he did between 2006 and 2009.

In December 2005 Kurajica won the 13th Salona GM Invitation Tournament in Solin as clear first. In the same year Kurajica was awarded the title of FIDE Trainer. , he shared his residence between Sarajevo and Santa Cruz de Tenerife.

On the September 2016 FIDE list his Elo rating is 2529.

References

External links 

Bojan Kurajica at 365Chess.com

1947 births
Living people
Chess grandmasters
Chess Olympiad competitors
Croatian chess players
Bosnia and Herzegovina chess players
Faculty of Humanities and Social Sciences, University of Zagreb alumni
Yugoslav chess players
World Junior Chess Champions
Chess coaches
Sportspeople from Ljubljana